Oleksiy Moyseyenko (born 25 October 1991) is a Ukrainian football striker who plays for Metalurh Zaporizhzhia.

Opanasenko is product of youth team sistem FC Burevisnyk Melitopol and FC Metalurh Zaporizhzhia. Made his debut for FC Metalurh entering as a second-half substitute against FC Illichivets Mariupol on 6 August 2010 in Ukrainian Premier League.

References

External links
Profile at FFU Official Site (Ukr)

1991 births
Living people
Ukrainian footballers
Ukraine student international footballers
FC Metalurh Zaporizhzhia players
FC Metalurh-2 Zaporizhzhia players
Ukrainian Premier League players
FC Bukovyna Chernivtsi players
FC Hirnyk-Sport Horishni Plavni players
FC Milsami Orhei players
Ukrainian expatriate footballers
Expatriate footballers in Moldova
Association football forwards
Ukrainian First League players
Sportspeople from Zaporizhzhia Oblast